Brokeback Mountain is a 2005 American neo-Western romantic drama film directed by Ang Lee and produced by Diana Ossana and James Schamus. Adapted from the 1997 short story of the same name by Annie Proulx, the screenplay was written by Ossana and Larry McMurtry. The film stars Heath Ledger, Jake Gyllenhaal, Anne Hathaway, and Michelle Williams and depicts the complex romantic relationship between two American cowboys, Ennis Del Mar and Jack Twist, in the American West from 1963 to 1983.

Lee became attached to the project in 2001 after previous attempts to adapt Proulx's story into a film did not materialize. Focus Features and River Road Entertainment would jointly produce and distribute the film. After Ledger and Gyllenhaal's casting was announced in 2003, filming commenced in various locations in Alberta, Canada, in 2004. Brokeback Mountain premiered at the 2005 Venice International Film Festival, where it won the Golden Lion, and was released to theaters on December 9 that year.

The film received universal acclaim, with particular praise for the performances of Ledger and Gyllenhaal, and was a commercial success, grossing over $178 million worldwide against its $14 million budget. At the 78th Academy Awards, Brokeback Mountain was nominated for Best Picture and won for Best Director, Best Adapted Screenplay, and Original Score. It garnered seven nominations at the 63rd Golden Globe Awards, and won four awards. At the 59th British Academy Film Awards, Brokeback Mountain was nominated for nine awards, winning Best Film, Best Direction, Best Adapted Screenplay and Best Supporting Actor (Gyllenhaal).

Brokeback Mountain was subject to controversies; its loss to Crash (2004) for the Academy Award for Best Picture, subsequent censorship, and criticism from conservative media outlets received significant attention. The sexuality of the main characters has been subject to discussion. Brokeback Mountain has also been regarded as a turning point for the advancement of queer cinema into the mainstream. In 2018, the film was selected for preservation in the United States National Film Registry by the Library of Congress as being "culturally, historically, or aesthetically significant".

Plot
In Wyoming in 1963, cowboys Ennis Del Mar and Jack Twist are hired by foreman Joe Aguirre to herd his sheep through the summer on grazing pastures on Brokeback Mountain. After a night of heavy drinking, Jack makes a pass at Ennis. While initially reluctant, Ennis becomes receptive, and he and Jack have sex in their tent. Despite Ennis telling Jack that it was a one-time incident, they develop a sexual and emotional relationship. Before parting ways, Ennis and Jack have a brawl that leaves both of them bloodied. Ennis later marries his longtime fiancée Alma Beers and has two daughters with her–Alma Jr. and Jenny. Jack returns the next summer seeking work, but Aguirre, who had observed Jack and Ennis on the mountain, refuses to hire him again. Jack moves to Texas, where he meets wealthy rodeo rider Lureen Newsome; they marry and have a son.

After four years apart, Jack visits Ennis. Upon meeting, the two passionately kiss, which a stunned Alma inadvertently witnesses. Jack broaches the subject of creating a life with Ennis on a ranch, but Ennis refuses, as he is unwilling to abandon his family and is haunted by a childhood memory of his father showing him the body of a man who was tortured and killed for suspected homosexuality. Ennis and Jack continue to infrequently meet for fishing trips while their respective marriages deteriorate. Lureen abandons the rodeo and goes into business with her father, which causes Jack to work in sales. Alma and Ennis divorce in 1975. Upon hearing about the divorce, Jack drives to Wyoming and tells Ennis that they should live together, but Ennis refuses to move away from his children. Upset, Jack finds solace with male sex workers in Mexico.

Alma takes custody of Alma Jr. and Jenny and marries Monroe, her store manager. She eventually confronts Ennis when he visits about the true nature of his relationship with Jack; the two spar, causing Ennis to cease contact with Alma. Ennis has a short-lived romantic relationship with a waitress named Cassie. Jack and Lureen befriend another couple, Randall and Lashawn Malone, and it is implied that Jack and Randall have a brief affair. At the end of a fishing trip, Ennis tells Jack that he cannot see him again before November due to work demands. The pair argue, blaming each other for their not being together. Ennis begins to cry, and Jack embraces him.

Sometime later, Ennis receives a returned postcard that he had sent to Jack, stamped with "Deceased". He calls Lureen, who says that Jack died in an accident from drowning in his own blood after a car tire exploded in his face. While she is describing what happened, two men beating Jack to death with a tire iron are shown. After Lureen tells him that Jack wanted to have his ashes scattered on Brokeback Mountain, Ennis visits Jack's parents in hopes of carrying out the request. Jack's father refuses and contends that Jack's ashes will be interred in a family plot. Ennis goes to Jack's bedroom, where he finds the shirts the two wore during their brawl, his shirt inside Jack's, in the closet. Ennis holds the shirts to his face, inhales deeply, and silently weeps. Jack's mother allows him to keep the shirts.

Later, a 19-year-old Alma Jr. arrives at Ennis's trailer to tell him that she is engaged. She asks for his blessing and invites him to the wedding, and after some hesitation, he agrees to attend. Once Alma Jr. leaves, Ennis goes to the closet where the two shirts hang together, though now Ennis's shirt is outermost. Next to them, tacked to the closet door, is a postcard of Brokeback Mountain. With tears in his eyes, he stares at the mementos, and says, "Jack, I swear..."

Cast

Credits adapted from TV Guide.

Production

Development 

Screenwriter Diana Ossana discovered Annie Proulx's short story, Brokeback Mountain, in October 1997, just days after its publication. She convinced writing partner Larry McMurtry to read it, who thought it was a "masterpiece". The pair asked Proulx if they could adapt it into a film screenplay; although she did not think that the story would work as a film, she agreed. In a 1999 interview with The Missouri Review, Proulx praised their screenplay. Ossana said that convincing a director and production company to make the film was a challenging and nonstop process. Gus Van Sant attempted to make the film, hoping to cast Matt Damon and Joaquin Phoenix as Ennis and Jack, respectively. He also considered Leonardo DiCaprio, Brad Pitt and Ryan Phillippe. Josh Hartnett was originally attached to the film but dropped out due to scheduling conflicts with The Black Dahlia. Damon, who previously worked with Van Sant on Good Will Hunting, told the director, "Gus, I did a gay movie (The Talented Mr. Ripley), then a cowboy movie (All the Pretty Horses). I can't follow it up with a gay-cowboy movie!" Instead, Van Sant went on to make the 2008 biographical film Milk, based on the life of gay rights activist and politician Harvey Milk. Edward Norton and Joel Schumacher were also linked with the project at one point.

Focus Features CEO James Schamus optioned the film rights in 2001, but thought it was a risky project. At Ossana's request, Schamus showed the story and screenplay to director Ang Lee. Lee decided to make Hulk instead; his experience of Hulk, and Crouching Tiger, Hidden Dragon from two years prior left him exhausted. In 2003, he considered retirement but Brokeback Mountain came back to his mind and tempted him back into filmmaking. Lee attempted to get the film made as an independent producer. However, this did not work out, and before Lee would take a break after finishing Hulk, he contacted Schamus about Brokeback Mountain. Schamus thought Brokeback Mountain embraces the American West without being a traditional Western, and told Lee that he should consider directing it. Lee said, "Towards the end [of the script] ... I got tears in my eyes". He was particularly drawn to the authentic rural American life and repression depicted in the story. Bill Pohlad of River Road Entertainment, who had a two-year partnership with Focus Features, helped finance the film.

Casting 
Casting director Avy Kaufman said Lee was very decisive about the actors for the lead roles. In 2003, screenwriters Ossana and McMurty suggested Heath Ledger (after being impressed by his performance in Monster's Ball), but the film studio thought he was not masculine enough. Regardless, Kaufman sent the script to Ledger, who thought it was "beautiful" and put himself forward. Gyllenhaal reacted to the script positively and signed on for the role; he also did not want to miss the opportunity working with Lee and friend Ledger. Gyllenhaal admired Ledger and described him as "way beyond his years as a human". Other actors were considered for the leads but Lee said they were too afraid to take on the roles.

From the beginning, Ledger wanted to portray Ennis and not Jack. He opined that Ennis was more complex; a masculine and homophobic character. Ledger said, "The lack of words he [Ennis] had to express himself, his inability to love", made the role enjoyable. Ledger, who grew up around horses, researched his character's personal traits, and learned to speak in Wyoming and Texas accents. Lee gave Ledger and Gyllenhaal books about cowboys who were gay or shared similar experiences as the characters depicted in Proulx's book. Ledger and Gyllenhaal also went to a ranch on the outskirts of Los Angeles and learned to ride horses. Gyllenhaal later said:

Lee interviewed between 20 and 30 actresses for the roles of Alma and Lureen. Michelle Williams was one of the first to audition for the role of Alma, and Lee thought she was perfect for the part. Anne Hathaway, who was filming The Princess Diaries 2: Royal Engagement at the time, showed up to the audition during her lunch break. She was wearing a ball gown and hairpiece "that was way over the top", but she still felt focused for the audition. At first, Lee did not think she was an obvious choice, but he was convinced with her audition and cast her as Lureen. Hathaway lied to Lee about her knowledge of horse riding in order to cast her. She took lessons for two months to prepare.

Lee was happy with Ledger and Gyllenhaal portraying Ennis and Jack, respectively, because he thought their "young innocence" will help carry a love story until the end. Lee added, "I think these two are among the best in their age group [...] Jake plays the opposite of Heath and it creates a very good couple in terms of a romantic love story. The chemistry, I think, is great." Once all four leads were cast, Lee remembered being impressed with their maturity despite their young age; "It really scared me how good they were".

Filming 

Principal photography began in the summer of 2004. While the novel is set in Wyoming, Brokeback Mountain was filmed almost entirely in the Canadian Rockies in southern Alberta. Lee was given a tour of the locations from the story in Wyoming by Proulx, but chose to shoot in Alberta citing financial reasons. The mountain featured in the film is a composite of Mount Lougheed south of the town of Canmore, Fortress and Moose Mountain in Kananaskis Country. The campsites were filmed at Goat Creek, Upper Kananaskis Lake, Elbow Falls and Canyon Creek, also in Alberta. Other scenes were filmed in Cowley, Fort Macleod, and Calgary. Brokeback Mountains production budget was approximately US$14 million.

Initially, Alberta's environmental department prohibited the crew from bringing domestic sheep into the Rockies, due to a risk of disease harming the local wildlife. The authorities eventually gave permission for them to shoot on one mountain, as long as they transported the domestic sheep in and out, every day. A biologist was hired to supervise this process.

Lee prefers working with cinematographers who are open minded, eager to learn, and able to show an interest in the story and content before talking about the visuals. Therefore, he selected Rodrigo Prieto for the job; saying, "I think he's versatile, and I wanted somebody who could shoot quickly [...] he was able to give me the tranquil, almost passive look I wanted for Brokeback. I believe a talent's a talent".

Ledger and Gyllenhaal, who were friends before Brokeback Mountain, were mostly unconcerned with the intimate scenes. The first sex scene between Ennis and Jack took 13 takes to meet Lee's expectation. The director would keep his distance from them during filming, allowing the actors to be free and spontaneous. Lee said, "I don't talk too much [to them] except for technical notes. So they [the intimate scenes] are a lot easier to deal with". Ledger was observant of Lee's directing style, saying, "There's two sides to Ang's direction — there's the pre-production, which is incredibly thorough and private, and then there's the shooting side, when he just doesn't say anything at all." Ledger said that this helped him try harder during takes. Gyllenhaal echoed Ledger's sentiment; "He just totally disconnects from you while you're shooting", but praised Lee's directorial skills. In regards to acting, Ledger was sometimes disrupted by Gyllenhaal's acting style; Gyllenhaal tended to improvise whereas Ledger preferred to be highly prepared. The director allowed Ledger to see his performance on the camera monitor so that he could improve.

During the last scenes where Ennis meets Jack's parents, production designer Judy Becker was tasked in finding a suitable house. Lee took inspiration from painters Andrew Wyeth and Vilhelm Hammershoi for the white interior walls. Using two cameras, Lee would capture the actors from both angles, and then change lenses and repeat. "When you edit it together, you can apply certain emphasis to certain reactions, emotions", Lee said. Ossana remembers that the last scenes were emotional for Ledger and personally affected him. The actors who played Jack's parents, Roberta Maxwell and Peter McRobbie, said Ledger was very quiet and gave a "powerful performance".

Executive producer Michael Hausman rented Airstream trailers for the cast and crew to sleep in. He created an on-set atmosphere which mimicked a summer camp, where people could bond and feel close. Hausman recalled that they would sit around the fireplaces, cook food and go fishing on the creek. The production was not without commotion; the cast suffered several injuries during filming. Williams sprained her knee in the early days of filming, therefore, her character's movements were altered to be either sitting or standing most of the time. Ledger also injured his hand when he punched a wall for a scene. During a kissing scene, Ledger almost broke Gyllenhaal's nose. The American Humane raised concerns that animals were treated improperly during filming, alleging that sheep were handled roughly and that an elk appeared to have been "shot on cue." They learned that the elk was shot with anesthetic, violating standard guidelines for animal handling in the film industry.

During post-production, Geraldine Peroni and Dylan Tichenor served as film editors, but Peroni died in August 2004 and Tichenor took over. The pair relied on Media Composer for editing, and sound engineer Eugene Gearty used Pro Tools for the creation of sound effects. Buzz Image Group were hired to create 75 visual effect shots, including computer-generated clouds, landscapes and sheep. For the film's theatrical poster, Schamus took inspiration from James Cameron's Titanic, which depicts two star-crossed lovers.

Music 

Gustavo Santaolalla scored the film's soundtrack, which consists of seventeen tracks as well as songs from Bob Dylan and Roger Miller. The album was released on October 25, 2005. Based on the story and one conversation with the director, Santaolalla was able to score the music before filming began. He said, "I mean if you are connected to the story and to the director, it makes a lot of sense because somehow you know, the music then becomes a part of the fabric of that film from the very beginning." He also used a real orchestra and played his own guitar.

Release

Box office
The film received a limited release in the United States on December 9, 2005, and grossed $547,425 in its first weekend. Over the Christmas weekend, and beginning of January 2006, the film expanded into more domestic theaters. On January 20, the film opened in 1,194 theaters, then 1,652 theaters on January 27, and 2,089 theaters on February 3, its widest release.

Brokeback Mountain was released in one theater in London on December 30 and received a wider release in the United Kingdom on January 6, 2006. The film was released in France on January 18, to 155 theaters, expanding to 290 by the third week. In its first week of release, Brokeback Mountain was in third place at the French box office. In Italy, the film grossed more than 890,000 in three days and was the fourth highest-grossing film in its first week. The film was released in Australia on January 26, where it ranked fourth place at the weekend box office. Brokeback Mountain was released in many other countries during the first three months of 2006. During its first week of release in Hong Kong, Brokeback Mountain was ranked first place at the box office, earning more than US$473,868 ($22,565 per theater). The film opened in Lee's native Taiwan on January 20. The film grossed $83 million in North America and $95 million internationally, for a worldwide $178 million. It is the highest-grossing release for Focus Features.

International distribution 
The film has been given different titles in accordance to different languages and regions. For the film's release in French and Italian, it was titled Le Secret de Brokeback Mountain and I segreti di Brokeback Mountain (The Secret(s) of Brokeback Mountain), respectively. In Canadian French, the title is Souvenirs de Brokeback Mountain (Memories of Brokeback Mountain). The film received two Spanish titles: Brokeback Mountain: En terreno vedado (In a forbidden terrain) for its release in Spain and Secreto en la Montaña (Secret in the mountain) for its release in Latin America. In Hungarian, the title was Túl a barátságon (Beyond friendship).The film was met with mixed responses in some regions, particularly China and Islamic nations of western Asia. According to reports, the film was not shown in theaters in China, though it was freely available in bootleg DVD and VHS. The Chinese government said the audience would have been too small; the foreign media accused the government of censorship. The word "brokeback" also entered the Chinese lexicon as a slang for homosexuality. The film was dubbed "the gay cowboy movie" by the press, a term that was propelled into the American vernacular. The film was also released in Turkey.

In the Middle East, distribution of the film became a political issue. Homosexuality is considered a crime in most Islamic nations and is taboo in the few countries where it is legal. Lebanon was the only Arab country to show the film, although in a censored format. The film was officially banned from screenings in the United Arab Emirates; however, the DVD of the film was permitted to be rented from stores such as Blockbuster Video.

On December 8, 2008, the Italian state-owned television channel Rai Due aired a censored version of the film, removing all the scenes with homoerotic references. Viewers protested, saying the deletions made the plot hard to follow. The Arcigay organisation accused the channel of homophobic censorship. The state-owned television network RAI said the Italian film distributor had mistakenly censored the film. RAI showed an uncensored version of the film on March 17, 2009.

Home media 
Brokeback Mountain was the first major film to be released simultaneously on both DVD and digital download via the Internet. It was released in the United States on April 4, 2006. More than 1 million copies of the DVD were sold in the first week, and it was the third-biggest seller of the week, behind Disney's The Chronicles of Narnia: The Lion, the Witch and the Wardrobe and King Kong. Although the ranking fluctuated daily, by late March and early April 2006, Brokeback Mountain had been the top-selling DVD on Amazon.com for several days running.

The DVD in Europe was released in the UK on April 24, 2006. This was followed by France in July, and Poland in September, a considerable time after the theater release in both countries. Brokeback Mountain was re-released in a collector's edition on January 23, 2007. On the same day, it was also released in HD DVD format. The film was released on Blu-ray in the UK on August 13, 2007, and in the U.S. on March 10, 2009. The Blu-ray contains special features including interviews with the screenwriters, director and a short documentary about composer Gustavo Santaolalla.

Critical response 
Brokeback Mountain was released to critical acclaim. On the review aggregator Rotten Tomatoes, the film holds an approval rating of 87% based on 247 reviews, with an average rating of 8.2/10. The site's critical consensus reads, "A beautifully epic Western, Brokeback Mountains love story is imbued with heartbreaking universality, helped by moving performances by Heath Ledger and Jake Gyllenhaal." On Metacritic, the film has a rating of 87/100 based on 41 reviews, indicating "universal acclaim."

David Ansen of Newsweek gave the film a positive review, praising the faithful screenplay. He adds, "There's neither coyness nor self-importance in Brokeback Mountain—just close, compassionate observation, deeply committed performances, a bone-deep feeling for hardscrabble Western lives. Few films have captured so acutely the desolation of frustrated, repressed passion." Writing for The Guardian, Peter Bradshaw praised Ledger and Gyllenhaal for their complementary performances. Bradshaw thought the film was "extremely moving, tragic even, and sensitive towards the feelings of the simple wives who attempt to understand their troubled husbands." Ann Hornaday of The Washington Post was equally positive, opining that the two lead actors' performances were unforgettable. In particular, she thought Ledger was impressive in his portrayal of a reserved and emotionally affected Ennis. Hornaday also praised the costumes and sets, writing "The Wyoming vistas are flawlessly manicured, Ledger and Gyllenhaal perfectly costumed and coiffed; even Ennis and Alma's sad little apartment over a laundromat seems to have been designed to death."

Roger Ebert gave Brokeback Mountain a  rating of four out of four stars in his review. Ebert was impressed with the level of attention to the characters, and thought that the film was as observant as the work by Swedish filmmaker Ingmar Bergman. Writing for The Sydney Morning Herald, Sandra Hall praised the screenplay and called Ledger and Gyllenhaal "finely tuned". Noting that it is a slow film, Hall thought the filmmakers had adapted Proulx's story without missing any nuances. USA Todays Mike Clark observed that Brokeback Mountain was directed and photographed with restraint, and praised its old-fashioned quality, and "unassuming but people-oriented" nature. The film also received a positive reaction from Christianity Today; the reviewer gave the film 3 out of 4 stars. In a mixed review, Ed Gonzalez of Slant magazine thought the film was too long, and the critic from Time magazine felt that the story became less intense towards the end. Conservative radio host Michael Medved described it as "extremely well done", but felt the film was pushing the gay agenda.

Several conservative political pundits, including commentators Bill O'Reilly, John Gibson, and Cal Thomas, shared Medved's view of the "agenda". Gibson made jokes about the film on his Fox News Radio program for months after its release. After the death of Ledger in 2008, Gibson was criticized for mocking the deceased actor, and later apologized. Conservative radio host Rush Limbaugh has referred to the film as "Bareback Mountain" and "Humpback Mountain". Don Imus referred to the film as "Fudgepack Mountain". Several conservative Christian groups, such as Concerned Women for America (CWA) and Focus on the Family, criticized the film for its subject matter. Following the success of Brokeback Mountain, Capote, and Transamerica at the Golden Globes Awards in 2006, Janice Crouse, a CWA member, cited these films as examples of how "the media elites are proving that their pet projects are more important than profit", and suggested they were not popular enough to warrant critical acclaim.

Film critic Gene Shalit, of The Today Show, described the character of Jack Twist as a "sexual predator" who "tracks Ennis down and coaxes him into sporadic trysts." The LGBT media group GLAAD said that Shalit's characterization of Twist was like calling Jack in Titanic a sexual predator due to his romantic pursuit of Rose. Shalit's openly gay son, Peter Shalit, wrote an open letter to GLAAD: "He [Gene] may have had an unpopular opinion of a movie that is important to the gay community, but he defamed no one, and he is not a homophobe." Gene Shalit later apologized for his review: "I did not intend to use a word that many in the gay community consider incendiary... I certainly had no intention of casting aspersions on anyone in the gay community or on the community itself. I regret any emotional hurt that may have resulted from my review of Brokeback Mountain."

Some commentators accused the filmmakers for hiding content about the film in advertising and in public events, such as press conferences and award ceremonies. New York Daily News writer Wayman Wong, Dave Cullen and Daniel Mendelsohn argued that the director, cast, and publicists avoided using the word gay to describe the story, and noted that the film's trailer did not show a kiss between the two men but showed a heterosexual love scene. The film's significance has been attributed to its portrayal of a same-sex relationship focused solely on the characters; it does not refer to the history of the LGBT social movements. It emphasizes the tragic love story aspect, and many critics have compared Ennis and Jack's drama to classic and modern romances such as Romeo and Juliet or Titanic, often using the term star-crossed lovers.

Proulx praised the film as "huge and powerful", adding, "I may be the first writer in America to have a piece of writing make its way to the screen whole and entire. [...] I was astonished that the characters of Jack and Ennis came surging into my mind again".

Critics' lists of 2005

Brokeback Mountain appeared on numerous American critics' lists as one of their favorite films of 2005.

 1st – Stephen Holden, The New York Times
 1st – Joe Morgenstern, The Wall Street Journal
 1st – Rene Rodriguez, Miami Herald
 1st – Ruthie Stein, San Francisco Chronicle
 1st – Scott Tobias, The A.V. Club
 2nd – Peter Travers, Rolling Stone
 2nd – Lisa Schwarzbaum, Entertainment Weekly
 2nd – Noel Murray, The A.V. Club
 2nd – Desson Thompson, The Washington Post
 2nd – Kevin Thomas, Los Angeles Times
 2nd – Mike Clark and Claudia Puig, USA Today
 3rd – Owen Gleiberman, Entertainment Weekly
 3rd – Kenneth Turan, Los Angeles Times
 3rd – Shawn Levy, Portland Oregonian
 3rd – William Arnold, Seattle Post-Intelligencer
 4th – David Ansen, Newsweek
 4th – Keith Phipps, The A.V. Club
 4th – Michael Atkinson, Village Voice
 5th – Roger Ebert, Chicago Sun-Times
 5th – Mike Russell, Portland Oregonian
 5th – Michael Wilmington, Chicago Tribune
 6th – Alison Benedikt, Chicago Tribune
 6th – Ella Taylor, L.A. Weekly
 7th – Nathan Rabin, The A.V. Club
 7th – Mick LaSalle, San Francisco Chronicle
 7th – Richard Roeper, Ebert & Roeper
 8th – Mick LaSalle, San Francisco Chronicle
 Top 9 (listed alphabetically) - New York Film Critics Online
 10th – Michael Phillips, Chicago Tribune
 Top 10 (listed alphabetically) – Manohla Dargis, The New York Times
 Top 10 (listed alphabetically) – Steven Rea, The Philadelphia Inquirer
 Top 10 (listed alphabetically) – Peter Rainer, The Christian Science Monitor
 Top 10 (listed alphabetically) – Carina Chocano, Los Angeles Times

The film was picked as one of the 400 nominated films for the American Film Institute list AFI's 100 Years...100 Movies (10th Anniversary Edition). Entertainment Weekly put it on its end-of-the-decade, best-of list. In a 2016 international poll conducted by BBC, Brokeback Mountain was ranked the 40th greatest film since 2000. In 2019, The Guardian ranked the film 66th in its 100 best films of the 21st century list.

Legal issues 
On January 6, 2006, Utah Jazz owner Larry H. Miller removed the film from theaters at the Jordan Commons entertainment complex in Sandy, Utah. Miller said the film's content had no resemblance of a traditional family, which he believed is "dangerous". Focus Features threatened legal action and announced it would no longer do business with him.

On March 23, 2006, Randy Quaid, who portrayed Joe Aguirre in the film, filed a lawsuit against Focus Features for misrepresenting Brokeback Mountain as "a low-budget, art house film with no prospect of making any money", in order to secure his role for a cheaper rate. On May 4, Quaid's publicist said he dropped the lawsuit as the company agreed to pay him a settlement; the company denies this, however.

Accolades

Brokeback Mountain garnered awards and nominations in a variety of categories, including for its directing, screenplay, acting, original score, and cinematography. At the 78th Academy Awards, Brokeback Mountain was nominated for the Academy Award for Best Picture and won three awards for Best Director, Best Adapted Screenplay, and Original Score. The film garnered seven nominations at the 63rd Golden Globe Awards, winning four for Best Motion Picture – Drama, Best Director, Best Song, and Best Screenplay. At the 59th British Academy Film Awards, Brokeback Mountain was nominated for nine awards, winning in the categories of Best Film, Best Direction, Best Adapted Screenplay and Best Supporting Actor for Jake Gyllenhaal.

After Brokeback Mountain lost the Academy Award for Best Picture to Crash, some critics accused the Academy of homophobia and for making a non-groundbreaking choice. Commentators including Kenneth Turan and Nikki Finke derided the Academy's decision, but Roger Ebert defended the decision to award Crash Best Picture, arguing that the better film won. Proulx wrote an essay expressing disappointment in the film not winning Best Picture. She also opined that Philip Seymour Hoffman's performance in Capote required less effort than that required of the actors in Brokeback Mountain. Following the loss, more than 800 supporters raised up to $26,000 to place an advertisement in the Daily Variety. The advert thanked the filmmakers "for transforming countless lives through the most honored film of the year."

The film is one of several highly acclaimed LGBT-related films of 2005 to be nominated for critical awards; others include Breakfast on Pluto, Capote, Rent, and Transamerica. It was voted the top film involving homosexual relationships by readers at TheBacklot.com. In 2010, the Independent Film & Television Alliance selected the film as one of the 30 Most Significant Independent Films of the last 30 years.

In 2015, The Hollywood Reporter polled Academy members on controversial past decisions, in which Brokeback Mountain won the revote for Best Picture.

Discussion on characters' sexuality
Critics and the cast and crew disagreed as to whether the film's two protagonists were homosexual, bisexual, heterosexual, or should be free of any sexual orientation classification. The film was frequently referred to in the media as the "gay cowboy movie", but a number of reviewers noted that both Jack and Ennis were bisexual. Sex researcher Fritz Klein said that the film was "a nice film with two main characters who were bisexual" and suggested that the character of Jack is more "toward the gay side" of the spectrum and Ennis is "a bit more toward the straight side".

Gyllenhaal said in 2006 that Ennis and Jack were straight men who "develop this love, this bond," saying in a Details interview: "I approached the story believing that these are actually two straight guys who fall in love." However, in 2015, he told The Hollywood Reporter that this was a "gay love story," and that his character was the more "overtly gay" of the two. Ledger told Time magazine in 2005: "I don't think Ennis could be labeled as gay. Without Jack Twist, I don't know that he ever would have come out. I think the whole point was that it was two souls that fell in love with each other."

Others said they felt the characters' sexuality was meant to be ambiguous. Clarence Patton and Christopher Murray of New York's Gay City News wrote that Ennis and Jack's experiences were metaphors for "many men who do not identify as gay or even queer, but who nevertheless have sex with other men". Entertainment Weekly wrote that "everyone called it 'The Gay Cowboy Movie' until they saw it. In the end, Ang Lee's 2005 love story wasn't gay or straight, just human." Tom Ciorciari of EFilmCritic.com wrote: "We later see Jack eagerly engage Lureen sexually, with no explanation as to whether he is bisexual, so in need of physical intimacy that anyone, regardless of gender, will do, or merely very adept at faking it."

LGBT non-fiction author Eric Marcus dismissed "talk of Ennis and Jack being anything but gay as box office-influenced political correctness intended to steer straight audiences to the film". Roger Ebert believed that both characters were gay, but doubted it themselves: "Jack is able to accept a little more willingly that he is inescapably gay." Producer James Schamus said, "I suppose movies can be Rorschach tests for all of us, but damn if these characters aren't gay to me." Brokeback Mountain author Annie Proulx said, "how different readers take the story is a reflection of their own personal values, attitudes, hang-ups."

When Ledger and Gyllenhaal were asked if they feared being cast in controversial roles, Ledger stated that he was not afraid of the role, but rather he was concerned that he would not be mature enough as an actor to do the story justice. Gyllenhaal has stated that he is proud of the film and his role, regardless of what the reactions would be. He thinks rumors of him being bisexual are flattering, stating: "I'm open to whatever people want to call me. I've never really been attracted to men sexually, but I don't think I would be afraid of it if it happened." Lee described himself as shy upon shooting the first sex scene and found it initially, technically difficult but praised Ledger and Gyllenhaal for their professionalism. Ledger's performance was described by Luke Davies as a difficult and empowering portrayal given the environment of the film: "In Brokeback Mountain the vulnerability, the potential for danger, is so great – a world so masculine it might destroy you for any aberration – that [Ledger's] real brilliance was to bring to the screen a character, Ennis Del Mar, so fundamentally shut down that he is like a bible of unrequited desires, stifled yearnings, lost potential."

Author Jim Kitses quoted Diana Ossana's acknowledgement of how the film "subverts the myth of the American West and its iconic heroes." He commented: "What drives the emotional attack of the film is the inadequacy of its characters to articulate and understand, let alone control, the experience that strikes them like a storm. American cowboys—of all people—have no business falling in love with each other. Practical and conservative types of a rough and ready manhood are by no means ready for man-love."

Legacy and impact
Brokeback Mountain was lauded as a landmark in LGBT cinema and credited for influencing several films and television shows featuring LGBT themes and characters. In Out at the Movies, Steven Paul Davies explains that as a result of the film's success, "most major film studios have been clamouring to get behind new, gay-themed projects... thanks to Brokeback, film financiers will continue to back scripts that don't simply rely on gay stereotypes...and that will certainly be progress." Davies cites Milk, Transamerica, and I Love You Phillip Morris as examples of such films. In 2018, Brokeback Mountain was selected for preservation in the United States National Film Registry by the Library of Congress as being "culturally, historically, or aesthetically significant".

The pair of shirts worn by Ledger's and Gyllenhaal's characters were sold on eBay on February 20, 2006, for US$101,100.51. The shirts were sold to benefit children's charity Variety. The buyer, Tom Gregory, film historian and collector, described the shirts as "the ruby slippers of our time," referring to an artifact from The Wizard of Oz film. In 2009, Gregory loaned the shirts to the Autry National Center in Los Angeles for its series, Out West, which explored the history of homosexual, bisexual and transgender people in the Old West. The series included a gallery tour, panel discussions, lectures and performances, with events held in four installments over the course of 12 months. According to the Autry, the series was the "first of its kind" for a western heritage museum.

A book, Beyond Brokeback: The Impact of a Film (2007) is a collection of personal stories of how people were influenced by the story and film, compiled from members of the Ultimate Brokeback Forum website. In an associated Out West series program, the Autry screened Brokeback Mountain in December 2010 to commemorate the film's fifth anniversary and held a staged reading of Beyond Brokeback by historian and Out West organizer Gregory Hinton. Beyond Brokeback has been presented as a staged reading at other venues, such as Roosevelt University in Chicago, on November 13, 2011, together with a panel discussion and screening of the film. An American opera, Brokeback Mountain, was composed by Charles Wuorinen with a libretto by Annie Proulx. Written in English, it premiered at the Teatro Real in Madrid on January 28, 2014. It was championed by impresario Gerard Mortier, who had commissioned it.

Several years after the film's release, Proulx said she regrets writing the story. She said that people have sent her too much fan fiction presenting alternative plots. Some authors, mostly men claiming to "understand men better than I do", often send their works. She said:

See also

 Brokeback Mountain: Original Motion Picture Soundtrack
 List of lesbian, gay, bisexual, or transgender-related films by storyline
 List of films considered the best
 Mixed-orientation marriage, sometimes referred to as a "brokeback" marriage

References

Further reading
 Proulx, Annie (1997, 1999, 2006). Close Range: Wyoming Stories.
 Proulx, Annie; McMurtry, Larry; Ossana, Diana (2005, 2006). Brokeback Mountain: Story to Screenplay. London, New York, Toronto and Sydney: Harper Perennial. .
 Packard, Chris (2006) Queer Cowboys: And Other Erotic Male Friendships in Nineteenth-Century American Literature. New York: Palgrave Macmillan. .
 Cante, Richard C. (March 2008). "Introduction"; "Chapter 3". Gay Men and the Forms of Contemporary US Culture. London: Ashgate Publishing. .
 Rich, B. Ruby (2013). "Ang Lee's Lonesome Cowboys". New Queer Cinema: The Director's Cut. London: Duke University Press. .

External links

 
 
 
 
 
 

 
2005 films
2005 controversies
2005 controversies in the United States
2005 independent films
2005 LGBT-related films
2005 Western (genre) films
2000s American films
2000s English-language films
2000s historical drama films
2000s historical romance films
2005 romantic drama films
American historical drama films
American historical romance films
American LGBT-related films
American romantic drama films
American Western (genre) films
Gay-related films
Male bisexuality in film
LGBT-related controversies in film
LGBT-related romantic drama films
LGBT-related controversies in the United States
LGBT in Wyoming
Homophobia in fiction
Neo-Western films
Censored films
Casting controversies in film
Obscenity controversies in film
Salary controversies in film
Films about anti-LGBT sentiment
Films about adultery in the United States
Film controversies in the United States
Films based on short fiction
Films set in 1963
Films set in the 1960s
Films set in the 1970s
Films set in the 1980s
Films set in Wyoming
Films shot in Alberta
Films shot in Wyoming
Films directed by Ang Lee
Films produced by James Schamus
Films scored by Gustavo Santaolalla
Films with screenplays by Larry McMurtry
Films that won the Best Original Score Academy Award
Films whose director won the Best Directing Academy Award
Films whose director won the Best Direction BAFTA Award
Films whose director won the Best Director Golden Globe
Films whose writer won the Best Adapted Screenplay Academy Award
Films whose writer won the Best Adapted Screenplay BAFTA Award
Best Drama Picture Golden Globe winners
Best Film BAFTA Award winners
Golden Lion winners
Independent Spirit Award for Best Film winners
Focus Features films
River Road Entertainment films
United States National Film Registry films